James Laxton is an American cinematographer best known for his collaborations with filmmaker Barry Jenkins, specifically his work on Jenkins' 2016 film Moonlight, for which he won an Independent Spirit Award and received his first Academy Award nomination.

Laxton started his career at Florida State University where he met his often collaborator, Barry Jenkins. The relationship built in college has led them to shoot countless films including the 2016 film Moonlight which was the recipient of multiple awards and nominations since the film's release. After graduating from University, Laxton began his work in the industry by assisting the camera department on features and shorts while also taking on other projects from directors like David Nordstrom, David Parker, Cole Schreiber and many more. Throughout his childhood he joined his mother onset, this experience being key to his decision to join the camera department. The rhythm of set, how total chaos would ensue and then settle with a single action, only for the director to call cut and for the mania to continue. Moments like this were key in inspiring a young James Laxton to think of a career in the film industry as an option.

Feature films

Moonlight 
Arguably his most critically acclaimed film was Moonlight directed by Barry Jenkins. The film takes themes of sexuality and explores them in a harsher urban environment. The cinematography of Moonlight took contemporary film-making and put a new lens on it. With a relatively low budget of 1.5 million dollars, there weren't a lot of resources that were able to be spent on things like underwater camera gear for example. However, challenges like these made it possible for Jenkins and Laxton to think outside of the box on how they would be able to pull certain shots off. This ingenuity gives birth to the cinematic language of the film and it projects boldly with every scene.

If Beale Street Could Talk 
After the commercial success of Moonlight, the next film for the two filmmakers would be a tragic love story between Tish Rivers played by KiKi Layne and a wood artist Alonzo 'Fonny' Hunt  played by Stephan James as they meet begin to build a life together until Fonny is accused of a crime he didn't commit. From this point on, Tish is doing everything that she can in order to set her love free. With the film being based on a novel by James Baldwin, there are several instances where the cinematography feels "novel-like" to indicate the sense of losing oneself in any given scene and how intricately the characters traits and emotions intertwine with one another. "To find and fine-tune the precise visual grammar of Baldwin’s mastery Jenkins followed a process that served him so well with his previous Oscar-winner. One of the keys to Moonlight transcending the limitations of its $1.5 million budget – trading docu-realism for crafted visual poetry of the highest level". The language that Jenkins and Laxton created for Moonlight creates a look well beyond the low budget and shed more light on the verite style cinematography.

Filmography

Short films

Television

References

External links
 

American cinematographers
Living people
Year of birth missing (living people)